Barilović is a village and a municipality in central Croatia, in the Karlovac County.

Demographics
There are a total of 2,990 inhabitants in the municipality, 87.29% of which are ethnic Croats and 11.84% are ethnic Serbs. The village itself is inhabited by 300 people.

The Census 2001 recorded the name of the municipality as Barilovići.

Settlements
According to the 2011 census, the municipality consists of the following settlements:

 Banjsko Selo, population 144
 Barilović, population 300
 Belaj, population 168
 Belajske Poljice, population 597
 Belajski Malinci, population 33
 Carevo Selo, population 29
 Cerovac Barilovićki, population 110
 Donja Perjasica, population 14
 Donji Skrad, population 19
 Donji Velemerić, population 155
 Gaćeško Selo, population 6
 Gornji Poloj, population 0
 Gornji Velemerić, population 108
 Kestenak, population 4
 Koranska Strana, population 11
 Koranski Brijeg, population 94
 Koransko Selo, population 33
 Kosijersko Selo, population 39
 Križ Koranski, population 44
 Leskovac Barilovićki, population 129
 Lučica, population 38
 Mala Kosa, population 5
 Mali Kozinac, population 29
 Marlovac, population 10
 Maurovići, population 7
 Miloševac, population 3
 Mrežnica, population 4
 Novi Dol, population 0
 Novo Selo Perjasičko, population 1
 Orijevac, population 3
 Perjasica, population 17
 Podvožić, population 298
 Ponorac Perjasički, population 17	
 Potplaninsko, population 7
 Siča, population 154
 Srednji Poloj, population 12
 Svojić, population 46
 Šćulac, population 134
 Štirkovac, population 5
 Točak Perjasički, population 1
 Veliki Kozinac, population 1
 Vijenac Barilovićki, population 68
 Zinajevac, population 4
 Žabljak, population 58

References

External links

 

Municipalities of Croatia
Populated places in Karlovac County